is a Japanese light novel series written by Kaoru Shinozaki. The series originated on the Shōsetsuka ni Narō website in November 2017, before Overlap acquired and published it in print with illustrations by KWKM in July 2018. A manga adaptation with composition by Keyaki Uchi-Uchi and illustrations by Shō Uyoshi began serialization on the Comic Gardo website in July 2019.

Plot
Mimori Touka and his classmates are suddenly summoned to a fantasy world by a goddess to act as heroes. While most of them are shown to have exceptional skills, Mimori has an E-rank. Deeming him to be useless, the goddess decides to banish Mimori to a dungeon where nobody has ever returned. However, it turns out that his skills are more abnormal than it seems. As such, he vows to have his revenge.

Media

Light novel
Written by Kaoru Shinozaki, the series began serialization on the novel posting website Shōsetsuka ni Narō on November 24, 2017. The series was later acquired by Overlap, who began publishing the series in print with illustrations by KWKM on July 25, 2018. As of December 2022, ten volumes have been released.

In July 2020, Seven Seas Entertainment announced that they licensed the novels for English publication.

Volume list

Manga
A manga adaptation, with composition by Keyaki Uchi-Uchi and illustrations by Shō Uyoshi, began serialization on the Comic Gardo manga website on July 26, 2019. As of December 2022, the series individual chapters have been collected into seven tankōbon volumes.

In July 2020, Seven Seas Entertainment announced that they also licensed the manga adaptation for English publication.

Volume list

Reception
Rebecca Silverman from Anime News Network praised the character development and high school politics, though she also felt it relied on tropes too much.

In BookWalker's Next Big Light Novel Hit poll, the series ranked ninth in the bunkobon category.

The series has 1.1 million copies in circulation between its digital and print releases.

See also
Hazure Skill: The Guild Member with a Worthless Skill is Actually a Legendary Assassin, another light novel series illustrated by KWKM

References

External links
  
  
  
 

2018 Japanese novels
Anime and manga based on light novels
Dark fantasy anime and manga
Isekai anime and manga
Isekai novels and light novels
Japanese webcomics
Light novels
Light novels first published online
Overlap Bunko
Seven Seas Entertainment titles
Shōnen manga
Shōsetsuka ni Narō
Webcomics in print